Cempaka LRT station is a Malaysian low-rise rapid transit station situated near and named after the nearby Taman Cempaka (Malay; English: Cempaka Estate), in Ampang Jaya, Selangor. The station is part of the Ampang Line (formerly known as STAR, and the Ampang and Sri Petaling Lines), and was opened on December 16, 1996, as part of the first phase of the STAR system's opening, alongside 13 adjoining stations along the Sultan Ismail-Ampang route.

Location
The Cempaka station is situated east from and named after the Ampang Jaya locality of Taman Cempaka to the southeast, and is within walking distance of Kampung Pandan Dalam (Inner Pandan Village) directly north from the station, Pandan Indah south. The station is accessible from two branch roads, one off Jalan Cempaka (Cempaka Road) from the north and another off Jalan Pandan Indah 6/1 (Pandan Indah Road 6/1).

The station was constructed along two leveled tracks, reusing the now defunct Federated Malay States Railway and Malayan Railway route between Kuala Lumpur, Ampang town and Salak South. The station is also located a mere 470 metres away from the neighbouring Cahaya station, which serves roughly the same locality.

Design

Overall, the Cempaka station was built as a low-rise station along two tracks for trains traveling in opposite direction. Because the station is nearly subsurface and features two side platforms, the station designates individual ticketing areas for each of the station's two platforms at their level, ensuring access to trains traveling the opposite direction is not freely possible. The station also serves as a public crossing across the Ampang Line tracks between Kampung Pandan Dalam and Pandan Indah via a walkway running underneath the tracks and platforms.

The principal styling of the station is similar to most other stations in the line, featuring curved roofs supported by latticed frames, and white plastered walls and pillars. Currently, only stairways are used to link street level with the station's ticket areas and platforms, so the station is not accommodative to disabled users. Lifts were installed around July 2011, but as of December 2011 they are still not yet operational.

Bus Service

See also

 List of rail transit stations in Klang Valley

Ampang Line
Railway stations opened in 1996
1996 establishments in Malaysia